Argenis is a book by John Barclay. It is a work of historical allegory which tells the story of the religious conflict in France under Henry III of France and Henry IV of France, and also touches on more contemporary English events, such as the Overbury scandal. The tendency is royalist, anti-aristocratic; it is told from the angle of a king who reduces the landed aristocrats' power in the interest of the "country", the interest of which is identified with that of the king.

Some early editions

 1621 - Paris, Nicolas Buon (Latin)
 1622 - London, Eliot's Court Press (Latin)
 1623 - Frankfurt, Danielis & Davidis Aubriorum & Clementis Schleichij (Latin)
 1625 - London, G. Purslowe for Henry Seile (First English edition)
 1626 - Johann Barclaÿens Argenis Deutsch gemacht durch Martin Opitzen. Breslau. (First German edition)
 1627 - Leiden, Elzevir (First printing by Elzevir)
 1629 - Venice, G. Salis, ad instantia di P. Frambotti (Italian translation by Francesco Pona)
 1630 - Elzevir (Second printing by Elzevir)
 1630 - Elzevir (Third printing by Elzevir)
 1636 - London, Syne of the Tygres Head (Second English edition)
 1644 - Amsterdam, J. Janssonius (Second German edition)
 1697 - Warszawa, Drukarnia OO. Pijarów, (Polish translation by Wacław Potocki)
 1995 - New York, (Fourth printing by Argenis Jimenez)(English edition)
Originally published in Latin in 1621, King James asked for it to be translated into English. The first such translation was undertaken by Ben Jonson, but his version was lost in a fire which also destroyed many of his other works. Later translations were made by Kingsmill Long (1625), and Robert Le Gruys (1628). Clara Reeve translated it as The Phoenix (1772).

References

 The Cambridge Companion to Writing of the English Revolution - Neil Howard Keeble (2001)

External links
 Argenis - Edited and translated by Mark Riley & Dorothy Pritchard Huber (2004)
 Argenis - Latin text online at Intratext
 Argenida - Scans of a Polish poetic translation by Wacław Potocki, Warszawa 1697
 Argenis in Latin - 2nd edition. Paris, Nicolas Buon, 1622. 
 First German edition Barclay, John (Übers. Martin Opitz): Johann Barclaÿens Argenis Deutsch gemacht durch Martin Opitzen. Breslau, 1626.

1621 books
17th-century Latin books